The Loft Sessions is the third album from California-based worship collective Bethel Music. The album was released on January 24, 2012 by Kingsway Music. Brian Johnson, Daniel James Mackenzie and Rick McDonald produced the album.

Prior to the release of the album, Kingsway Music released "Come to Me" which featured the vocals of Jenn Johnson on December 13, 2011 as the lead single of the album.

Background
The album was recorded live over the course of several nights in a refurbished loft in the historic Sherven Square building. The Bethel Music collective gathered with friends and family for the duration of the recordings.

Singles
Kingsway Music released "Come to Me" which featured the vocals of Jenn Johnson in 2011 as the lead single of the album. The song reached number one on the U.S. iTunes Christian Chart.

Critical reception

Jessica Morris of Jesus Freak Hideout rated the album four stars out of a possible five, citing "the musicality and restraint Bethel displays in stripping back the smoke and mirrors is what makes The Loft Sessions a phenomenal release." and concluded that "each track of this striking album draws the listener deeper into the presence of God and leaves them wanting more of Bethel music, and of Jesus." AllMusic's Jon O'Brien, affixing a three star rating of the album, believes that Bethel's album was showcasing "a new, organic sound which veers more toward the contemporary nu-folk scene than their usual soft rock fare." The album managed to attain a four star rating average from New Release Today reviewers Kevin Davis and Kelly Sheads. New Release Today's Kevin Davis rated the album four-and-a-half stars, stating that "Every song on this album has quickly become a staple in my playlist of my favorite worship anthems. Every song is worshipful and catchy." Kelly Sheads rated the album three-and-a-half stars, saying "With an eclectic sound and a variety of musical styles, no song is the same, keeping the listener focused on the message within." Elliot Rose of Cross Rhythms rated the album seven out of ten squares, noting the lack of  "passion and atmosphere of previous releases". In a review for Louder Than The Music, Jono Davies bestowed the album four-and-a-half stars, recommending "If you're looking for a bunch of songs to use in a time of reflectiveness with God, with a few upbeat happy and non cheesy acoustic songs thrown in, then look no further than The Loft Sessions."

Track listing

Personnel
Adapter from AllMusic.

 Brandon Aaronson — bass
 Breezy Baldwin — design
 Jason Bourneman — soundscape
 Ryan Braun — post production assistant
 Shannon Clark — set design
 Miguel Cruz — camera operator
 Cory Fournier — camera operator, gaffer
 Steffany Frizzell — background vocals, featured artist, vocals
 John-Paul Gentile — acoustic guitar
 Kalley Heiligenthal — background vocals
 John Hendrickson — drums
 Luke Hendrickson — engineer, keyboards
 Jordan Jackiew — mixing
 Andrew Jackson — engineer
 Brian Johnson — acoustic guitar, background vocals, featured artist, vocals
 Jenn Johnson — featured artist, vocals
 Leah Johnson — background vocals
 Timothy Jon — cello
 Chris Jones — camera operator
 Christiann Koepke — make-up
 Matt Lopez — accordion
 Daniel James Mackenzie — accordion, acoustic guitar, banjo, bass, electric guitar, engineer, keyboards, producer
 Rick McDonald — producer
 Jason Miller — photography
 Graham Moore — background vocals, percussion
 Mike Myers — main personnel
 Aaron Rich — camera operator, director, editing
 Alexandria Rickett — make-up
 Jeremy Riddle — featured artist, vocals
 Martin Rosenhoff — cello
 Jeff Schnweeweis — background vocals, engineer, production assistant
 Walter Serafini — project coordinator
 Drew Small — production assistant
 Matt Stinton — featured artist, vocals
 Joel Taylor — executive producer
 Hunter G.K. Thompson — background vocals, featured artist, vocals
 Rebekah Van Tinteren — violin
 Gabriel Wilson — set design

Charts

Album

Singles

References

2012 live albums
Bethel Music albums